G4 or G.IV may refer to:

Transport

 AEG G.IV, a German World War I heavy bomber
 Allegiant Air, by IATA airline designator
 Caudron G.4, a 1915 French biplane
 Friedrichshafen G.IV, a 1918 German medium bomber
 Gotha G.IV, a 1916 German heavy bomber
 Gulfstream IV, a family of private jet aircraft
 Mitsubishi G4M "Betty", a World War II Japanese fast bomber
 Soko G-4 Super Galeb, a jet trainer/light attack jet of Yugoslav origin
 USS G4 (SS-26), a 1914 G-class submarine of the United States Navy
 County Route G4 (California), a county highway in Santa Clara County, California, USA
 G4 Beijing–Hong Kong and Macau Expressway, an expressway in China
 G4 (Taichung Metro), also known as Songzhu Station or Jiushe Station, a station under construction in the Taichung Metro
 G4-class freighter, a cargo ship design
 LNER Class G4, a class of British steam locomotives

Biology
 G4 EA H1N1, a strain of influenza
 G-quadruplex, a DNA secondary structure

Science and technology
 Group 4 element, a class of elements on the Periodic Table
 ATC code G04 Urologicals, a subgroup of the Anatomical Therapeutic Chemical Classification System
 G4, a type of bi-pin lamp base (socket), a lamp fitting where the pin spacing is 4mm
 LG G4 smartphone
 Moto G4, a line of smartphones
 Group 4 compression, a type of image compression used in fax machines and some image file formats

Apple Computer
 PowerPC G4, a type of microprocessor by Freescale used by Apple
 Power Mac G4, a series of personal computers made by Apple Inc in July 1999
 PowerBook G4, a series of Professional notebooks made by Apple Inc in 2001
 iMac G4, a series of personal computer made by Apple Inc in January 2002
 Xserve G4, an Xserve server made by Apple Inc in May 2002
 iBook G4, an iBook series of consumer notebooks in October 2003
 Mac Mini G4, a Mac Mini series of ultracompact computer in January 2005

Entertainment
 G4 (American TV network), an American television channel
 G4 (Canadian TV channel), a former Canadian television channel 
 G4 (band), a British vocal troupe
 Grob's attack, an opening move in chess

Organisations
 G4 nations, four nations that support each other's bids to become permanent members of the United Nations Security Council: Brazil, Germany, India, and Japan
 Big Four (Western Europe), sometimes called 'G4', a group of powerful countries in Europe
 VIP Protection Unit, a unit of the Hong Kong Police Force (originally Section G, Division 4)

See also
 Group 4 (disambiguation)
 G4S, formerly Group 4 Securicor
 4G (disambiguation)
 Gang of Four (disambiguation)
 Kamen Rider Agito: Project G4, the Kamen Rider Agito film
 Kamen Rider G4, the movie exclusive character
 Giv (disambiguation)